Moderates in Revolution (MIR) is a political association founded in 2012 by the lawyer, banker and entrepreneur Gianpiero Samorì. MIR is currently an associate party of Us with Italy, of whose executive committee Samorì is a member.

In the 2013 general election the party presented its lists in the centre-right coalition and obtained the 0.24% of the vote for the Chamber of Deputies and the 0.22% of the vote for the Senate, gaining no seats. In May Walter Ferrazza, a MIR member, was appointed Undersecretary in Enrico Letta's coalition government. In November 2013 MIR became an associate party of Forza Italia and Ferrazza resigned from Undersecretary, after that the newly-formed FI had gone into the opposition.

MIR and Renaissance, a party led by Vittorio Sgarbi, formed a joint list which ran its own candidates in the 2018 general election in Friuli-Venezia Giulia, gaining a few hundred votes (less than 0.1% for both the Chamber of Deputies and the Senate).

References

External links
 www.miritalia.it

Political parties established in 2012
2012 establishments in Italy
Classical liberal parties
Liberal parties in Italy